The Copa Ciudad de Trujillo, was an international exhibition football competition hosted in Trujillo, Peru since 2010. It features four teams: Trujillo's major team Universidad César Vallejo, and guest teams from Colombia (in 2010 and 2011), Ecuador (in 2010), and Peru (in 2010 and 2011). All matches are played at the Estadio Mansiche in Trujillo, the home stadium of the Universidad César Vallejo.

The 2010 edition was won by Peruvian club Universidad San Martín, and the 2011 edition was won by Peruvian club Universidad César Vallejo.

Champions

Titles by club

2010 Copa Ciudad de Trujillo

Semifinals

Third Place 

Tied 2-2 on aggregate. América de Cali win 4-3 on penalties.

Final

2011 Copa Ciudad de Trujillo

First round

Second round

References

 

Peruvian football friendly trophies
Sports in Trujillo, Peru